The Mount Cameroon forest shrew or arrogant shrew, (Sylvisorex morio) is a species of mammal in the family Soricidae endemic to Cameroon. Its natural habitat is subtropical or tropical moist montane forests.

References

Sylvisorex
Mammals of Cameroon
Endemic fauna of Cameroon
Mammals described in 1862
Taxonomy articles created by Polbot